The 57th Otaman Kost Hordiienko Separate Motorized Infantry Brigade is a formation of the Ukrainian Ground Forces. The brigade was formed beginning in November 2014 in the city of Kropyvnytskyi in Kirovohrad Oblast. Initially the brigade consisted of three volunteer territorial defence battalions. Already by summer 2015 the brigade deployed to fight in the war in Donbas. The ground forces plan to mechanize the brigade in the future.

During the 2022 Russian invasion of Ukraine, the brigade received the recently established "For Courage and Bravery" award by Ukrainian president Volodymyr Zelenskyy for liberating a number of settlements in the Kherson Oblast. The unit was also noted for its servicemember's already being awarded 275 state awards previously.

Current Structure 
As of 2017 the brigade's structure was as follows:

 57th Motorized Brigade, Kropyvnytskyi
 Headquarters & Headquarters Company
 17th Motorized Infantry Battalion "Kropyvnytskyi"
 34th Motorized Infantry Battalion "Batkivshchyna"
 42nd Motorized Infantry Battalion "Rukh Oporu"
 Brigade Artillery Group
 Headquarters & Target Acquisition Battery
 Howitzer Artillery Battalion (D-20)
 Anti-tank Artillery Battalion (MT-12 Rapira)
 Anti-Aircraft Missile Artillery Battalion
 Reconnaissance Company
 Tank Company
 Engineer Company
 Maintenance Company
 Logistic Company
 Signal Company
 Medical Company
 Sniper Platoon

References

Motorized brigades of Ukraine
Military units and formations established in 2014
Military units and formations of Ukraine in the war in Donbas